, there were about 4,000 electric vehicles in Delaware.

Government policy
, the state government offers tax rebates of up to $2,500 for battery electric vehicle purchases, and $1,000 for plug-in hybrid vehicles.

Charging stations
, there were 131 public charging stations in Delaware, with 25 of them offering DC charging.

The Infrastructure Investment and Jobs Act, signed into law in November 2021, allocates  to charging stations in Delaware.

, the state government recognizes I-95, US-13, US-113, and DE-1 as potential charging station corridors, with plans for charging stations every .

By county

Kent
, there were 42 battery electric vehicles and 47 plug-in hybrid vehicles registered in Kent County.

New Castle
In October 2021, New Castle County enacted an ordinance requiring 10% of parking spaces in new residential buildings constructed to be equipped with EV charging infrastructure.

Sussex
The Seaford municipal government announced the city's first public charging station in January 2022.

References

Delaware
Road transportation in Delaware